Josef Urban (17 June 1899 – 2 September 1968) was a Czechoslovak wrestler. He was born in Středočeský kraj in June 1899. He won an Olympic silver medal in Greco-Roman wrestling in 1932. He also competed at the 1928 Summer Olympics. Urban died on 2 September 1968, at the age of 69.

References

External links

1899 births
1968 deaths
Czechoslovak male sport wrestlers
Olympic wrestlers of Czechoslovakia
Wrestlers at the 1928 Summer Olympics
Wrestlers at the 1932 Summer Olympics
Czech male sport wrestlers
Olympic silver medalists for Czechoslovakia
Olympic medalists in wrestling
Medalists at the 1932 Summer Olympics